"Back in the Day" is a 1994 single by Ahmad. Released when Ahmad was only 18, the song is a nostalgic remembrance of childhood and young teenage years, from a somewhat jaded adult perspective. "Back in the Day" was Ahmad's only major hit single, making it to number 26 on the Billboard Hot 100 and number 19 on the US R&B chart. The song contains a sample of the Teddy Pendergrass song "Love TKO"; and it was the first single of his 1994 self-titled album and was RIAA-certified gold.

The TKO Remix of "Back in the Day" (produced By Maurice Thompson of Barr 9 Productions) is featured as the single and on the soundtrack of The Wood, a 1999 motion picture.

Charts

Weekly charts

Year-end charts

Certifications

Legacy
Mariah Carey's 12th studio album, Memoirs of an Imperfect Angel, featured an interpolation of "Back in the Day" on the track "Candy Bling". Travie McCoy's debut studio album Lazarus features a song titled "Akidagain" that interpolates "Back in the Day". On J. Cole's mixtape The Come Up, his song "School Daze" also interpolates "Back in the Day". Cassidy did an interpolation of this song entitled "Back in the day". In 2013, Complex added the song in its list of nineteen great songs made by teenage rappers in the last 19 years. Complex editor Kyle Kramer said "The blueprint for many songs by nostalgic teenagers since, "Back in the Day" perfectly captures the wistful vibe of the rearview look with its warm chorus and deeply descriptive verses. As a result, ever since back in the day, the song's been a classic."

References

1993 songs
1994 debut singles
Giant Records (Warner) singles
Music videos directed by Joseph Kahn
Songs about nostalgia